The 1919 municipal election was held December 8, 1919 to elect a mayor and five aldermen to sit on Edmonton City Council and four trustees to sit on the public school board.  T P Malone, Paul Janvrin, T S Magee, and Joseph Henri Picard were acclaimed to two-year terms on the separate school board.  In the election's only plebiscite, Edmontonians rejected a proposal to pay their aldermen.

There were ten aldermen on city council, but five of the positions were already filled: Charles Hepburn, Samuel McCoppen, Henri Martin, John McKenzie, and Andrew McLennan were all elected to two-year terms in 1918 and were still in office.

With the election of Labour candidates Clarke, Kinney, East and Sheppard plus the continuing alderman McCoppen, Labour held five of the 11 seats on council following this election.

There were seven trustees on the public school board, but three of the positions were already filled: Joseph Duggan, Frank Crang, and William Rea had all been elected to two-year terms in 1918 and were still in office.  The same was true on the separate board, where J J Murray, Joseph Driscoll, and Joseph Gariépy were continuing.

Voter turnout

11213 voters cast ballots. There were 15378 eligible voters, for a voter turnout of 72.9%.

Results

 bold or  indicates elected
 italics indicate incumbent
 "SS", where data is available, indicates representative for Edmonton's South Side, with a minimum South Side representation instituted after the city of Strathcona, south of the North Saskatchewan River, amalgamated into Edmonton on February 1, 1912.

Mayor

Aldermen
Each voter could cast up to five votes.

Public school trustees

Separate (Catholic) school trustees

Plebiscite

References

Election History, City of Edmonton: Elections and Census Office

1919
1919 elections in Canada
1919 in Alberta